Scott Irby-Ranniar (born September 15, 1984) is an American actor and singer born in Harlem, New York. He is best known for originating the role of Young Simba in the Broadway production of The Lion King in 1997. He is a former member of the band Steel Train.

External links

Living people
Singers from New York City
American male stage actors
1984 births
21st-century American singers
21st-century American male singers
Steel Train members